Israel competed at the 2009 World Championships in Athletics, which took place from 15 to 23 August. 4 athletes have been able to achieve the qualifying standards: Yochai Halevi in the men's triple jump, Irina Lenskiy in the women's 100 m hurdles, Yevgeniy Olkhovskiy in the men's pole vault and Wodage Zvadya in the men's marathon. After missing the call to leave the training grounds, Yochai Halevi was denied entry to the men's triple jump qualification. An appeal by the Israeli delegation was accepted by the organizing committee, and despite Halevi had not achieved the qualifying standards, he competed in the men's long jump.

Results
Track and road events

Field and combined events

References

External links
Official competition website

Nations at the 2009 World Championships in Athletics
Athletics World Championships
2009